The Entombment of Christ is an oil-on-oak panel painting by Rembrandt dated c. 1633–1635. It measures 32.2 x 40.5 cm. The composition is a variant of a painting of the same subject now in the Alte Pinakothek, in Munich. 

In 1783 the Scottish anatomist William Hunter bequeathed it to University College (now the University of Glasgow). Since 1807 it has hung in the university's art gallery, the Hunterian Museum and Art Gallery.

References

1635 paintings
Paintings by Rembrandt
Paintings in Glasgow
Rembrandt